Lunicoleone.com is the sixth album released by rapper, Luni Coleone. It was released on August 20, 2002 for Out of Bounds Records and was produced by Luni Coleone and Kenya Baker. Lunicoleon.com peaked at No. 10 on the Billboard Top Heatseekers chart, thus far his last album to make it to the Billboard charts.

Track listing
"Log On"- 1:03
"End of Da' World"- 4:21 (featuring Mitchy Slick)
"Ride Da' Beef"- 3:53 (featuring Messy Marv)
"Ghetto Prayer"- 3:58
"Can't Fucc Wit Us"- 4:00 (featuring Mac Dre)
"Like I Do"- 2:46
"West Was Won"- 4:22 (featuring X-Raided)
"Got Yo Bacc"- 3:49 (featuring Hollis)
"Ya Okay"- 4:05
"Get That Feddy"- 3:28 (featuring Hollow Tip)
"Fucc Life"- 4:04
"All on Da' Line"- 4:11 (featuring Hollow Tip & J-Mack)
"Wana Hate Me"- 3:19
"Wrong or Right"- 4:18 (featuring Mitchy Slick)
"Better Days/Log Off"- 4:23 (featuring Shawn & I-Rocc)

2002 albums
Luni Coleone albums
Albums produced by Big Hollis